A fried brain sandwich is a sandwich of sliced calves' brains on sliced bread.

Thinly sliced fried slabs on white toast became widespread on menus in St. Louis, Missouri, after the rise of the city's stockyards in the late 1880s, although demand there has so dwindled that only a handful of restaurants still offer them. They remain popular in the Ohio River valley, where they are served heavily battered on hamburger buns. In Evansville, Indiana, they are still offered at several "mom and pop" eateries.

Replacement with pig's brains
Brains from cows over 30 months old at slaughter are no longer permitted to be sold for human consumption in the United States. Some restaurants have taken to serving pigs' brains instead of cows' brains due to concerns regarding bovine spongiform encephalopathy, commonly known as "mad cow disease". Because pigs' brains are substantially smaller than cows' brains, the amount required for each sandwich increases. Each brain must be cleaned before being sliced and pigs' brains produce fewer slices.

See also

 Eggs and brains
 List of delicacies
 List of regional dishes of the United States
 List of sandwiches

References

Cuisine of St. Louis
Culture of Evansville, Indiana
Cuisine of the Midwestern United States
American sandwiches
Brain dishes
Fried foods
Offal sandwiches